Luigi Pinelli was an Italian fencer. He competed in the individual sabre event at the 1908 Summer Olympics.

References

Year of birth missing
Year of death missing
Italian male fencers
Olympic fencers of Italy
Fencers at the 1908 Summer Olympics